Coladenia maeniata is a species of spread-winged skipper butterflies. It is found in China (north-western Yunnan and western Sichuan).

References

Pyrginae
Butterflies described in 1896
Butterflies of Asia
Taxa named by Charles Oberthür